Dorothy Gillespie (1920–2012) was an American artist and sculptor who became known for her large and colorful abstract metal sculptures. Her works are featured at her alma mater (Radford University) in Virginia, where she later returned to teach, as well as in New York (where she was an artist in residence for the feminist Women's Interart Center), Wilmington, North Carolina, and Florida.

Early and family life
Gillespie was born in Roanoke, Virginia, in 1920, the daughter of Earl V. Gillespie and his wife Lilian. She had a younger brother, Earl V. Gillespie Jr. (born circa 1925), and a younger sister, Lilian (b. circa 1933), and from her youth she showed an affinity for art. She graduated from Jefferson High School in Roanoke in 1937. She later attributed her vivid designs and bright colors to memories of a Christmas tree in Roanoke. Although her parents disagreed with her wish to pursue art as a career, she enrolled both at Radford University near her hometown, and the Maryland Institute College of Art in Baltimore, Maryland. The director of the Maryland Institute, Hans Schuler, helped foster her career in fine art.

Gillespie married Bernard Israel in 1946, and they had three children before his death in 1992.

Career 
On June 5, 1943, aged 23, Gillespie moved to New York City. There she took a job at the B. Altman department store as assistant art director. She joined the Art Students League where she was exposed to new ideas about techniques, materials, and marketing, and also created works at Atelier 17 printmaking studio, where Stanley William Hayter encouraged her to experiment with her own ideas.

She and her husband opened a restaurant and night club in Greenwich Village to support their family. She returned to making art in 1957, and worked at art full-time after they sold the nightclub in the 1970.

In 1977, Gillespie gave her first lecture series at the New School for Social Research, and she would give others there until 1982. She taught at her alma mater as a Visiting Artist (1981–1983) and gave Radford University some of her work to begin its permanent art collection. Gillespie then served as Woodrow Wilson visiting Fellow (1985–1994), visiting many small private colleges to give public lectures and teach young artists. She returned to Radford University to teach as Distinguished Professor of Art (1997–99). She also hosted a radio program, the Dorothy Gillespie Show on WHBI-FM in New York, from 1967–1973.

Gillespie began moving away from realism and into the abstraction that marked her career. Gillespie returned to New York City in 1963 to continue her career. She maintained a studio through the 70s and worked towards feminist goals in the art industry, picketing the Whitney Museum, helping to organize the Women's Interart Center, curating exhibitions of women's art, and writing articles raising awareness of her cause.

By the 1980s, Gillespie's work had come to be known internationally. She completed many commissions for sculptures in public places, including the Lincoln Center and Epcot Center in Orlando, Florida.

Gillespie also maintained a studio in Florida and served on the board of trustees of the Maitland Art Center in Maitland, Florida, from 1996 to 1999, and on the Broward County Cultural Affairs Council from 1993 to 1994.

Her work is unique in its use of ribbon-like shape and use of bright colors. Her sculptures are crafted out of aluminum covered in enamel.

Death and legacy
Dorothy Gillespie died in Coral Gables, Florida, on September 30, 2012. She established a foundation to continue her work and the women's art movement after her death. In 2020, the Taubman Museum of Art organized and exhibition titled Celestial Centennial: The Art and Legacy of Dorothy Gillespie in honor of her centennial. Her papers are included in the Miriam Schapiro Archives on Women Artists at Special Collections and University Archives at Rutgers University.

References

Further reading
Dorothy Gillespie: A "Woman Artist" K. Thompson Fort Worth Museum of Art

1920 births
2012 deaths
American women sculptors
20th-century American sculptors
21st-century American sculptors
20th-century American women artists
21st-century American women artists
Radford University alumni
Maryland Institute College of Art alumni
Art Students League of New York alumni
People from Orlando, Florida
Artists from Roanoke, Virginia
Sculptors from New York (state)